A number of steamships have been named Sirdhana

Ship names